The 2008 Swedish Rally, officially 57th Uddeholm Swedish Rally, was the second round of 2008 World Rally Championship season. It was the season's first and only event held on snow- and ice-covered gravel roads. The rally took place during February 7–10, beginning with Super Special Stage placed in rallybase, Karlstad. The rally was also the first round of Production Car World Rally Championship this season.

Even though it snowed before the rally, eliminating the threat of calling the event off, the mild temperatures caused cancellation of stages 12 and 18, shortening the overall competitive kilometers count.

The rally was won by BP Ford World Rally Team's 22-year-old Jari-Matti Latvala. With his debut win, Latvala became the youngest winner in the history of the World Rally Championship, breaking Henri Toivonen's record from the 1980 RAC Rally. Latvala's teammate and compatriot Mikko Hirvonen was second and Stobart VK M-Sport Ford's Gigi Galli completed an all-Ford podium. Subaru World Rally Team's Petter Solberg was fourth, followed by Andreas Mikkelsen, Dani Sordo, Toni Gardemeister, Juho Hänninen, Mads Østberg and Jari Ketomaa. Fifth-placed Matthew Wilson ran into technical problems with throttle on the penultimate stage and had to retire. Sébastien Loeb crashed out and rolled his car while running third, then retired again, after restarting under SupeRally and winning two stages, because of the damaged engine. Henning Solberg  inherited the third place, but later suffered a puncture causing him to slip further down and then crashed while running fourth and was forced to retire for the second day; after rejoining the fight under SupeRally format Norwegian was the fastest driver on day three, winning all the remaining stages.



Results

Special stages 
All dates and times are CET (UTC+1).

Championship standings after the event

Drivers' championship

Manufacturers' championship

Production championship
Points table:

References

External links 
 Results at eWRC.com

Swedish Rally, 2008
Swedish Rally
Rally